Rajendra Singh Lodha (died 3 October 2008), popularly known as R. S. Lodha, was an Indian chartered accountant and the chairman of the Birla Corporation.

Lodha became co-chairman of the Birla Corporation in 2001. In July 2004, Priyamvada Birla, chairperson of the Birla Corporation, died and was revealed to have bequeathed the entire assets of the company to Lodha in 1999. Lodha was also the will's executor. This sparked a protracted legal battle between members of the Birla family and Lodha that included more than 110 court cases at one time. Despite this, Lodha took charge as chairman of the corporation.

Death
Lodha died in London of a heart attack on 3 October 2008. He had two sons and a daughter. The legal battle over the Birla estate continued after his death.

References

Year of birth missing
2008 deaths
Indian accountants